The Collegiate Church of St Mary is a Church of England parish church in Warwick, Warwickshire, England. It is in the centre of the town just east of the market place. It is grade I listed, and a member of the Major Churches Network.

The church has the status of collegiate church as it had a college of secular canons. In governance and religious observance it was similar to a cathedral (although not the seat of a bishop and without diocesan responsibilities). There is a Bishop of Warwick, but this is an 
episcopal title used by a suffragan bishop of the Diocese of Coventry.

History

Foundation and early years
The church foundations date back nine hundred years, being created by Roger de Beaumont, 2nd Earl of Warwick, in 1123. In addition to founding the church, de Beaumont established the College of Dean and Canons at the church. The only surviving part of the Norman church which de 
Beaumont had built is the crypt.

The chancel vestries and chapter house of the church were extensively rebuilt in the 14th century by a later Earl of Warwick, Thomas de Beauchamp (later pronounced Beecham), in the Perpendicular Gothic style. His descendants built the Chapel of Our Lady, commonly known as the Beauchamp Chapel. It contains the effigial monuments of Richard de Beauchamp, 13th Earl of Warwick, Ambrose Dudley, 3rd Earl of Warwick, and Robert Dudley, 1st Earl of Leicester. Buried in the chancel of the church is 
William Parr, 1st Marquess of Northampton, the brother of Queen consort Catherine Parr.

Sixteenth century to present
The college was dissolved in 1546, and the church was granted by the crown to the burgesses of Warwick. Before their destruction in the Civil War, Wenceslaus Hollar copied many of the stained glass windows in the Beauchamp Chapel, showing heraldry of the Beauchamp family.

The church, along with much of Warwick, was devastated by the Great Fire of Warwick in 1693. The nave and tower of the building were completely destroyed. In 1704, the rebuilt church was completed in a Gothic design by William Wilson 
(appointed by the Crown Commissioners). Sir Christopher Wren is also said to have contributed to the design, but that is disputed. The design was described by John Summerson as being "as remarkable for its success as for its independence in style from other seventeenth-century English Gothic".

Deans of the College

Robert Plesset, 1282
Thomas de Sodynton, 1290
William de Apperley, 1297
Robert Tankard, 1306
Richard de Alcester, 1313
Robert de Geryn, 1314
Robert de Lee, 1321
Thomas Lench, 1338
Robert de Endredeby, 1340
Nicholas Southam, 1361
Thomas Yonge, 1395
John Porter, 1432
Robert Cherbury, 1443
William Berkswell, 14
John Southwell, 1469
Edmund Albone, M.D., 1481
Richard Brackenburgh, 1485
William Stokedale, 1498
Edward Haseley, 1498
Ralph Colingwode, 1507
John Allestre, 1510
John Carvanell, 1515
John Knightley, 1542

Music

Organs
There are two organs in St. Mary's, the transept organ and one at the west end. The specifications of both organs can be found on the National Pipe 
Organ Register.

Organists (prior to 1976)

William Witteney 1409
John Soursby 1432
John Skyrrowe 1562
Richard Charpe 1565
Thomas Dean 1719
William Dean 1744
Jonathan Hobbs 1773
Mary Hobbs 1787
Mrs R. Hobbs 1801
James Marshall 1802
Edward Dearle 1833
William Clayton 1844
W. Wyver 1861
James Shaw 1864
D. Middleton 1864
Bernard Farebrother 1867
Edwin Aspa 1871
A.J. Sutton 1874
Hanson de la Haye Blackith 1882
William Bellamy 1886
William McDuff 1894
Allen Blackall 1898
Peter Burton 1946
Thomas Tunnard 1950
Douglas Clarke 1958
Geoffrey Holroyde 1962
Andrew Fletcher 1973

(The position of Organist was replaced with that of Director of Music from 1976)

Directors of Music

Andrew Fletcher 1976 (originally appointed as Organist in 1973)
Paul Trepte 1981
Simon Lole 1985
Mark Shepherd 1994
Chris Betts 1998
Katherine Dienes 2001-2007
Thomas Corns 2008-2017
Oliver Hancock 2018

Assistant Organists

Arthur Wills 1946-48
Edward Higginbottom 1965-67
Colin Roy 1967-1969
Andrew Fletcher 1971-73
Arthur Hilyer 1974
Tim Peters
Charles Matthews 1987-89

(The position of Assistant Organist was replaced with that of Organist from 1989)

Organists (from 1989)
Kevin Bowyer 1989
Christopher Monks 1998
(from 1999 the position of Organist was combined with the new post of Assistant Director of Music)

Organists and Assistant Directors of Music
Christopher Monks 1999 (originally appointed as Organist in 1998)
Luke Bond 2002 (Assistant Director of Music, Truro Cathedral from 2008 to 2017, then at St George's Chapel, Windsor Castle)
Ruaraidh Sutherland 2006 (Organist at Christ's Hospital from 2019)
Mark Swinton 2011

Image gallery

References

Further reading
 "Colleges: St Mary, Warwick", A History of the County of Warwick, 
Volume 2 (1908), pp. 124–129.

External links

Church website
Vicar's website

 

1123 establishments in England
Religious organizations established in the 1120s
Church of England church buildings in Warwickshire
Buildings and structures in Warwick
Collegiate churches in England
Grade I listed churches in Warwickshire
12th-century church buildings in England